Hinte is a village and a municipality in the district of Aurich, in Lower Saxony, Germany. It is situated approximately 20 km south of Norden, and 6 km north of Emden.

References

Towns and villages in East Frisia
Aurich (district)